Inverso may refer to:

 Inverso Pinasca,  village and comune in the Metropolitan City of Turin in the Italian region Piedmont
 Peter Inverso, American banker and Republican Party politician